George H. Bush (February 18, 1857 – July 1, 1898) was an American lawyer politician from New York.

Life 
Bush was born in Greenfield Park, New York on February 18, 1857. He was of Irish and German parentage.

Bush studied law in Cornell University and passed the state bar shortly after graduating. He served as Town Clerk of Wawarsing and Police Justice of Ellenville.

In 1888, Bush was elected to the New York State Assembly as a Democrat, representing the Ulster County 3rd District. He served in the Assembly in 1889, 1890, 1891, and 1892. In 1892, he was the Majority Leader and Chairman of the Ways and Means Committee.

Bush was a delegate to the 1894 New York Constitutional Convention. A month before the Convention, he was appointed Building Commissioner for the Eastern New York Reformatory.

Bush's wife was Lulu DuBois. He died at home in Ellenville of a GI bleed on July 1, 1898.

References

External links 

 The Political Graveyard

1857 births
1898 deaths
American people of Irish descent
American people of German descent
People from Wawarsing, New York
People from Ellenville, New York
New York (state) lawyers
19th-century American lawyers
Cornell University alumni
Democratic Party members of the New York State Assembly
19th-century American politicians